Nikola Radosová (born 3 May 1992) is a Slovak female volleyball player. She is part of the Slovakia women's national volleyball team. She competed at the 2019 Women's European Volleyball Championship.

Clubs
  VK Prievidza (2002–2007)
  COP Nitra (2007–2008)
  SVS Post Schwechat (2008–2013)
  SC Potsdam (2013–2015)
  BKS Bielsko-Biała (2015–2016)
  CSM București (2016–2018)
  Dresdner SC (2018–present)

References

External links 

 Profile on FIVB
 Profile on CEV

1992 births
Living people
Slovak women's volleyball players
Slovak expatriate sportspeople in Austria
Slovak expatriate sportspeople in Germany
Slovak expatriate sportspeople in Poland
Slovak expatriate sportspeople in Romania
Sportspeople from Bojnice